The Story of Karrawingi the Emu (1946) is an illustrated children's book by Australian author Leslie Rees and illustrator Walter Cunningham.  It won the Children's Book of the Year Award: Older Readers in 1946.

Story outline

The book tells the story of the life of the noble Australian Emu packed with action, adventure and the sense of racing speed that is part of an emu's heritage.

Critical reception

A note in The Western Mail stated: "The prose and the illustrations unfold the life story of an emu, giving a spice of adventure, a little natural history and a great deal of realism in story-telling and ability in illustration."

Awards
 1946 - winner Children's Book of the Year Award: Older Readers

See also
 1946 in Australian literature

References

1946 children's books
Australian children's books
CBCA Children's Book of the Year Award-winning works
Books about birds